Advanced Placement (AP) Psychology (also known as AP Psych) and its corresponding exam are part of the College Board's Advanced Placement Program. This course is tailored for students interested in the field of psychology and as an opportunity to earn Advanced Placement credit or exemption from a college-level psychology course. It was the shortest AP exam until the AP Physics C exam was split into two separate exams in 2006.

AP Psychology is often considered one of the easier AP exams; relative to the other tests, the material is rather straightforward and much easier to self-study. Among all the social studies Advanced Placement exams, the Psych exam had the second-highest passing rate in 2018.

Topics covered
The College Board provides a course of study to help educators prepare their students for the AP Psychology exam. The exam covers the following 9 areas. The percentage indicates the portion of the multiple-choice section of the exam focused on each content area:

Exam

The exam includes two sections: a 70-minute multiple choice section (100 questions) and a 50-minute free response section (2 prompts). The multiple choice provides two-thirds of the grade and the free-response provides the remaining third.

Beginning with the May 2011 AP Exam administration, total scores on the multiple-choice section are based only on the number of questions answered correctly. Points are no longer deducted for incorrect answers. Grading (the number of points needed to get a certain score) is slightly more strict as a result.

Grade distribution

The exam was first held in 1992. Grade distributions for the Psychology exam scores since 2010 were:

References

Notes

External links
AP Psychology at CollegeBoard.com

Advanced Placement
Science education